The Hundred of Hutchison refers to a cadastral unit. It could be
 Hundred of Hutchison (Northern Territory)
 Hundred of Hutchison (South Australia)